John F. Lander was a footballer who played as an inside-forward for Burslem Port Vale in 1892.

Career
Lander joined Burslem Port Vale in September 1892. His first match was a 4–0 defeat by Sheffield United in a Second Division game at Bramall Lane on 17 December 1892. He scored two goals in a 3–0 win over Walsall Town Swifts at the Athletic Ground on New Year's Eve, but was released at the end of the 1892–93 season having played just three games for the club.

Career statistics
Source:

References

Year of birth missing
Year of death missing
English footballers
Association football forwards
Port Vale F.C. players
English Football League players